Rupert Paul Tang Choon (31 May 1914 – 5 September 1985) was a cricketer who played first-class cricket for Trinidad from 1934 to 1955.

All-rounder, 1934-35 to 1942-43
Tang Choon played the first part of his career as a leg-spinning all-rounder. In his fourth first-class match, against Barbados in the Inter-Colonial Tournament in 1935-36, he made 72 and 2 batting at number eight, and took 6 for 123 and 3 for 131 in a 36-run victory for Trinidad. In 1938, for R.S. Grant's XI against British Guiana, he took 3 for 13 and 5 for 81 to help his side to an innings victory. His highest score in this period was 83, batting at number seven against Barbados in 1940-41.

He "came near to being chosen to tour England with the 1939 West Indian side" but the leg-spinners Bertie Clarke and John Cameron were preferred.

He played for North Trinidad in the Beaumont Cup from 1934-35 to 1951-52, in the days before the matches had first-class status. In the 1934-35 match he took 8 for 32.

Batsman, 1943-44 to 1954-55
Tang Choon seldom bowled after the 1942-43 season, taking only one wicket during the rest of his first-class career. His batting improved, however. In his two matches in 1944-45 he scored his first century, 132, 40 and 83. Against MCC in 1947-48, batting now at number five, he scored 103, adding 244 for the fourth wicket in three and a half hours with Gerry Gomez. "A neat, lithe batsman, Tang Choon gave a truly brilliant display," noted Wisden. However, he scored only 7 and 17 in Trinidad's second match against MCC shortly afterwards.

He captained Trinidad in both their matches in 1951-52. He scored 104 and 47 not out against British Guiana in 1953-54, his third and last century. He played his last first-class match in 1954-55 against the Australians when he was 40 years old.

References

External links
 Rupert Tang Choon at Cricket Archive
 Rupert Tang Choon at Cricinfo

1914 births
1985 deaths
Trinidad and Tobago cricketers
Trinidad and Tobago people of Chinese descent
Hakka sportspeople
Sportspeople of Chinese descent